The World Goes On is a collection of twenty-one short stories by László Krasznahorkai. Originally published in Hungarian by Magvető in 2013, it was later translated to English by John Batki, Ottilie Mulzet, and George Szirtes and published in 2017 by New Directions Publishing.

The English translation was shortlisted for the 2018 Man Booker International Prize.

Contents
 He
 I. Speaks
 "Wandering-Standing" 
 "On Velocity" 
 "He Wants to Forget" 
 "How Lovely" 
 "At the Latest, in Turin" 
 "The World Goes On" 
 "Universal Theseus" 
 "One Hundred People All Told" 
 "Not on the Heraclitean Path" 
 II. Narrates
 "Nine Dragon Crossing" 
 "One Time on 381" 
 "György Fehér's Henrik Molnár" 
 "Bankers" 
 "A Drop of Water" 
 "Downhill on a Forest Road" 
 "The Bill" 
 "That Gagarin" 
 "Obstacle Theory" 
 "Journey in a Place Without Blessings" 
 "The Swan of Istanbul" 
 III. Bids Farewell
 "I Don't Need Anything from Here"

Publication
The novel was published in Hungarian by Magvető in March 2013. It was translated into English by John Batki, Ottilie Mulzet, and George Szirtes and published in 2017 by Tuskar Rock Press in the United Kingdom and New Directions Publishing in the United States. The translation was first published by Tuskar Rock on 2 November 2017.

Many of the stories had been previously published:

 1990: "At the Latest, in Turin" ("Legkésőbb Torinóban")
 2001: "Not on the Heraclitean Path" ("Nem a hérakleitoszi úton")
 2002: "The World Goes On" ("Megy a világ előre")
 2003: "One Hundred People All Told" ("Talán száz ember összesen")
 2005: "Wandering-Standing" ("Bolyongás állva")
 2008: "Downhill on a Forest Road" ("Lefelé egy erdei úton")
 2009: "On Velocity" ("A sebességről")
 2010: "The Bill: For Palma Vecchio, at Venice" ("Számla: Palma Vecchiónak, Velencébe")
 2010: "Nine Dragon Crossing" ("Nine Dragons Crosing")

Reception
At the review aggregator website Book Marks, which assigns individual ratings to book reviews from mainstream literary critics, the novel received a cumulative "Positive" rating based on 11 reviews: 4 "Rave" reviews and 7 "Positive" reviews.

In its starred review, Publishers Weekly wrote, "This book breaks all conventions and tests the very limits of language, resulting in a transcendent, astounding experience."

Kirkus Reviews praised Krasznahorkai's "dense, philosophically charged prose", comparing it to the works of James Joyce and Friedrich Nietzsche.

Claire Kohda Hazelton of The Observer called it "a masterpiece of invention, utterly different from everything else".

References

2013 short story collections
Hungarian books
Magvető books
Postmodern books
Works by László Krasznahorkai
2013 in Hungary